Anatoly Korbut (born 6 September 1973) is a Soviet rower. He competed in the men's coxed pair event at the 1992 Summer Olympics.

References

External links
 

1973 births
Living people
Soviet male rowers
Olympic rowers of the Unified Team
Rowers at the 1992 Summer Olympics
Place of birth missing (living people)